Frederick R. Smalls (born January 17, 1963) is a former American football linebacker and arena football linebacker / fullback. He played college football at West Virginia. He was drafted in the seventh round (182nd overall) of the 1986 NFL Draft by the San Diego Chargers.

College career
Smalls, who was born in Philadelphia, Pennsylvania, enrolled at West Virginia University in 1982. In his freshman season, Smalls recorded six tackles, a fumble recovery. In, 1983 as a sophomore, he recorded 13 tackles and a pass break-up as a backup.

In 1984, as a junior, Smalls earned the starting position. That season, he recorded 87 tackles, two interceptions, a fumble recovery, and two sacks. He was named to the NEA All-America team. As a senior, in 1985, Smalls totaled 97 tackles, five forced fumbles, a fumble recovery, and three sacks. He was also named to the AP All-East team.

Professional career

National Football League
Smalls was selected in the seventh round, 182nd overall by the San Diego Chargers in the 1986 NFL Draft. However, he was cut in August 1986.

In 1987, he joined the Ottawa Rough Riders of the Canadian Football League (CFL). Also in 1987, he played three games for the Philadelphia Eagles in 1987. In 1988, he spent time with the Tampa Bay Buccaneers, during training camp before retiring in July.

Arena Football League
In 1990, Smalls joined the Pittsburgh Gladiators of the Arena Football League (AFL). He only spent a short part of 1990 with the Gladiators, recording five tackles. He then moved to the Washington Commandos, where he played fullback along with linebacker. He finished the season with 18 tackles and a sack on defense with the Commandos and three receptions for 25 yards and 12 rushes for 44 yards and a touchdown on offense. In 1991, Smalls joined the Albany Firebirds. That season, he recorded four tackles and a sack.

References

1963 births
Living people
Players of American football from Philadelphia
American football linebackers
American football fullbacks
West Virginia Mountaineers football players
San Diego Chargers players
Ottawa Rough Riders players
Philadelphia Eagles players
Tampa Bay Buccaneers players
Pittsburgh Gladiators players
Washington Commandos players
Albany Firebirds players